The Argentine ambassador in Santiago de Chile is the official representative of the Government in Buenos Aires to the Government of Chile.

List of representatives 

Argentina–Chile relations

References 

 
Chile
Argentina